Patrington Haven is a hamlet in the East Riding of Yorkshire, England, in an area known as Holderness.

It forms part of the civil parish of Patrington.  The hamlet has a pub called the Burns Head that is directly opposite the village green with the pond stocked with fish

Surrounding the church are four public houses. and a fifth public house in Patrington Haven itself. The shopping square in the centre of the village has two high-street banks, an established butchers and a fish and chip shop. There is a post office, bakery, doctors and chemist all within the village along with newsagents, garage and vets.

In Patrington Haven is an established 5 Star Award Winning Leisure Park called "Patrington Haven Leisure Park".  The leisure park was established around 1985 when the RAF Station Patrington closed and the land purchased by the leisure park. In June 2013 a memorial sculpture to the RAF station was unveiled at the site.

The village was visited by the Beatles in November 1963 before playing a gig in nearby Hull.  The fab four enjoyed a pint and sing song in the Burns Head pub before returning to Hull.

Spurn Point with its bird sanctuary is supported by the RSPB and is a few miles south-east of Patrington Haven village.

References

Villages in the East Riding of Yorkshire
Holderness